David Mitchell (16 February 1829 – 25 March 1916) was a Scottish-Australian builder, responsible for Melbourne's  Royal Exhibition Building. He was the father of Dame Nellie Melba.

Biography

Born in Forfarshire, Scotland, in 1829, David Mitchell emigrated to Australia in 1852.

Mitchell is noted for building Scots' Church, Melbourne, St Patrick's Cathedral, Eastern Hill, Menzies Hotel in William Street, Melbourne (1857) and Presbyterian Ladies' College, East Melbourne (1874). His grandest accomplishment was the Royal Exhibition Building, which became the first Australian building to be awarded UNESCO World Heritage status.

In 1878 he bought land outside Lilydale on which he opened and operated the Cave Hill limestone and marble quarry. The business worked in tandem with his building company and was a great success, operating as the David Mitchell Estate Ltd after his death until it was sold to a Belgian conglomerate in 2002. It finally ceased operations in 2015.

David Mitchell died on 25 March 1916 and is buried in the Melbourne General Cemetery.

His eldest daughter, born Helen Porter Mitchell, was the renowned soprano Dame Nellie Melba; artist Helen Lempriere was a niece.

References

Joan Campbell, 'Mitchell, David (1829–1916)', Australian Dictionary of Biography, Volume 5, MUP, 1974, pp 259–260.

Australian builders
1829 births
1916 deaths
Scottish emigrants to colonial Australia
People from Angus, Scotland